Ramón José de Arce y Rebollar (1757 – 1844) was a Spanish churchman who served as Archbishop of Burgos from 1797 to 1801; as Grand Inquisitor of the Spanish Inquisition from 1797 to 1808; as Archbishop of Zaragoza from 1800 to 1816; and as Patriarch of the West Indies from 1806 to 1815.

Biography

Ramón José de Arce was born in Selaya, Cantabria in 1757.  He was educated at the Colegio Mayor de Cuenca of the University of Salamanca.  After university he became an official in the Finance Ministry of the Real Junta de Juros.  He then became a member of the Council of Castile.

He was appointed Archbishop of Burgos on December 18, 1797, and was appointed Grand Inquisitor of the Spanish Inquisition at the same time.  He was consecrated as a bishop on March 4, 1798.  He was translated to the Archbishopric of Zaragoza on July 20, 1801.  He was appointed Patriarch of the West Indies on August 26, 1806.

Spain was invaded by the First French Empire in 1808, becoming a client state of the French Empire.  A series of sermons that Arce delivered during the occupation were widely believed to be pro-French.  As such, after Spain regained its independence during the Peninsular War in 1814, there was pressure on Arce to resign.  He resigned his archbishopric and patriarchate on July 15, 1816.  He subsequently lived in exile in Paris, where he died on February 16, 1844.

See also
Catholic Church in Spain

References

1757 births
1844 deaths
Grand Inquisitors of Spain
Archbishops of Burgos
Archbishops of Zaragoza
18th-century Roman Catholic archbishops in Spain
19th-century Roman Catholic archbishops in Spain
University of Salamanca alumni